The Wife's Relations, The Lost Heiress, is a 1928 American silent comedy film directed by Maurice Marshall and starring Shirley Mason, Ben Turpin and Gaston Glass.

Cast
 Shirley Mason as Patricia Dodd  
 Ben Turpin as Rodney St. Clair  
 Gaston Glass as Tom Powers  
 Armand Kaliz as Clifford Rathburn  
 Arthur Rankin as Bud  
 Flora Finch as Mrs. Cyrus Dodd  
 Lionel Belmore as Cyrus Dodd  
 Maurice Ryan as Tubby  
 James Harrison as Jimmy

References

Bibliography
 George A. Katchmer. Eighty Silent Film Stars: Biographies and Filmographies of the Obscure to the Well Known. McFarland, 1991.

External links

1928 films
1928 comedy films
Silent American comedy films
1920s English-language films
American black-and-white films
Columbia Pictures films
American silent feature films
1920s American films